Ceroid-lipofuscinosis neuronal protein 5 is a protein that in humans is encoded by the CLN5 gene.

The neuronal ceroid lipofuscinoses (CLN or NCL) are a group of autosomal recessive, progressive encephalopathies in children. They are characterized by psychomotor deterioration, visual failure, and the accumulation of autofluorescent lipopigment in neurons and other cell types. The main childhood forms are the infantile type (Santavuori-Haltia disease; MIM 256730), the late infantile type (Jansky-Bielschowsky disease; MIM 204500), and the juvenile type (Batten disease; MIM 204200) based on the age of onset, clinical course, neurologic and ophthalmologic findings, and ultrastructural analysis (Carpenter et al., 1977 [PubMed 193610]).[supplied by OMIM]

References

External links
  GeneReviews/NCBI/NIH/UW entry on Neuronal Ceroid-Lipofuscinoses

Further reading